1859 in archaeology

Excavations
 February – Excavation of Viroconium Cornoviorum (Wroxeter) under Thomas Wright begins.
 Excavation of Nydam Mose in Denmark under Conrad Engelhardt begins (continues to early 1864).
 Excavation of Camirus on Rhodes under Alfred Biliotti begins (continues to 1864).

Finds
 Vigna Randanini Jewish catacombs in Rome.

Publications
 J. M. García publishes an account of Monte Albán.
 Charles Roach Smith — Illustrations of Roman London.

Miscellaneous
 26 May & 2 June – Geologist Joseph Prestwich and amateur archaeologist John Evans report (to the Royal Society and Society of Antiquaries of London, respectively) the results of their investigations of gravel-pits in the Somme valley and elsewhere, extending human history back to what will become known as the Paleolithic Era.
 Imperial Archaeological Commission founded in Saint Petersburg.
 Royal Geographical Society is given a Royal Charter by Queen Victoria.

Births

Deaths
 6 May: Alexander von Humboldt, explorer, writer

See also 
 Table of years in archaeology
 1858 in archaeology
 1860 in archaeology

References

Archaeology
Archaeology by year
Archaeology
Archaeology